Gilroy High School is a co-educational public school located in Gilroy, California, that serves the city of Gilroy. A part of the Gilroy Unified School District, is one of two public comprehensive high schools in the city and has an approximate enrollment of 1,500 students.

History 

Gilroy High School opened in 1911 at the site that now houses South Valley Middle School on IOOF Ave. The campus moved to its current location in 1978.

The school served as a temporary mass vaccination site in 2021 during the COVID-19 pandemic.

Curriculum 
Gilroy High offers a variety of course options.  There are more than 15 Advanced Placement courses offered. There are a variety of fine arts, such as choir, band, drama, and art.  There are many Career and Technical Education (CTE) programs, including automotive mechanics, animation, culinary arts, floral design, and sports medicine.

Starting with the Class of 2018, all students are expected to meet the University of California A-G entrance requirements.  In addition, beginning with the Class of 2013, all students must complete 80 hours of community service during their high school careers.

Gilroy High is one of the few high schools offering Project Lead the Way's Biomedical Sciences program.  This four-year program allows students to investigate the roles of biomedical professionals as they study the concepts of human medicine, physiology, genetics, microbiology, and public health.

Gilroy High completes the District's Spanish Dual Immersion K-12 Program by offering classes such as Biology in Spanish.

Extracurricular activities 
Gilroy High has a wide variety of extracurricular activities, including an extensive athletics program.

The Associated Student Body (ASB) is the student government, and runs many events and activities, such as dances, blood drives, and spirit days.  The Link Crew helps to unite the student body.

There are a variety of clubs on campus.  Some of these include an art club, auto club, drama club, science club, and the sister cities club.

Athletics 
The school's mascot is the mustang and all athletic teams representing the school go by the mustang nickname. The school's colors are blue, white, and gold. All of the school's athletic teams compete in the Central Coast Section (CCS).

The wrestling team at Gilroy High School has had much success, winning its fifteenth straight CCS championships in 2017 while having Coach Greg Varella and Assistant Coach Marco Sanchez named California State Coaches of the Year in 2015. Gilroy also placed second in state in 2008. The team has produced six state champions in the span of six years. Jesse Delgado, who wrestled at Gilroy High School and the University of Illinois, has gone on to have much success in his college career winning the NCAA title at 125 pounds in 2013 and 2014. The 2 time Olympian and former UFC Light Heavyweight and Heavyweight champion Daniel Cormier is the current wrestling coach at Gilroy High School.

The boys' soccer team has been successful in seasons past, winning the Tri-County Athletic League (TCAL) title in 2006–2007, while also winning the 2006–2007 CCS championship. Gilroy defeated Bellarmine College Preparatory in the CCS final, 2-0 and ended the season ranked among the top 12 teams in the country by the National Soccer Coaches Association of America (NSCAA).

The football team has also had successful seasons, advancing to the CCS championship game in 2008 while winning the TCAL title in the same year.

The Girls Varsity Field Hockey team won the MTAL League nine years in a row while being undefeated in league play. During the 2010–11 season, they joined the BVAL in the Mount Hamilton Division. The 2008–09 and 2009–10 teams both reached the CCS semi-finals. The 2010–2011 team reached the CCS championship game.

The Boys Varsity Track and Field team won the CCS team championship in 2011.

Awards and recognition 
Gilroy High received California's Distinguished School Awards in 1994 and 2009.

Notable alumni

 Ivie Anderson (ca. class of 1923): jazz vocalist, notably with Duke Ellington
 Frank LaCorte (class of 1969): former Major League Baseball pitcher
 Danny Ayers (class of 1988): Professional Bowler, PBA Professional Bowlers Association Member, USBC Bowling Academy Instructor, Bowling writer, Bowling Historian
 John Canzano (class of 1989): Sports columnist, TV-radio commentator, Associated Press Sports Editors award winner in column writing and investigative reporting
 Billy Carlile: Professional football player, bronze medalist for USA at 2017 World Games
 Jason Conrad (class of 2008): Professional basketball player
 Jesse Delgado (class of 2010): Collegiate wrestler for University of Illinois, two-time (2013, 2014) NCAA national wrestling champion at 125 pound weight class
 Jeff Garcia (class of 1988): Professional football quarterback in Canadian Football League (CFL) (1994–1998), NFL (1999–2009), and UFL (2010); four-time CFL West Division All-Star and four-time NFL Pro Bowl selection; was quarterback for the San Francisco 49ers from 1999 to 2003 
 Chris Gimenez (class of 2001): Professional baseball player, catcher for Minnesota Twins 
 Charles Gubser (class of 1932): Republican member of United States House of Representatives for California's 10th congressional district from 1953 to 1974; taught at school (then known as Gilroy Union High School) from 1939 to 1943 
 Robert Guerrero (class of 2001): Professional boxer
 Santino William Legan, perpetrator of the Gilroy Garlic Festival shooting.
 Alfonso Motagalvan (class of 2004): professional soccer player
 John Ordway (class of 1968): ambassador
 Kevin Rubio (class of 1986): filmmaker and writer 
 Randy Spendlove (class of 1982): record producer, songwriter, Grammy Award winner
 Olga Talamante: Chicana political activist
 Derek Bruton (class of 1985): Professional Basketball Center in Japan Professional Basketball League (1990–93), Collegiate Basketball at Stanford University (1985–90)

Notable staff 
 Daniel Cormier: UFC Heavyweight and Light Heavyweight Champion. 2 time Olympian. Head wrestling coach. 
 Marco Sanchez: Wrestler for Puerto Rico at the 1996 Summer Olympic games. Former principal.
 Mark Speckman: American gridiron football coach and former player. Former football head coach at Gilroy High School for the 1983–85 seasons.

See also 
Gilroy Unified School District

External links
 Gilroy High School Website
 Gilroy Unified School District Website

References

High schools in Santa Clara County, California
Public high schools in California
Gilroy, California
Educational institutions established in 1912
1912 establishments in California